Andrés "Andy" Freire (born January 14, 1972) is an Argentine entrepreneur. He served as Minister of Modernization, Innovation and Technology of the City of Buenos Aires. He was also the main candidate to legislators of the City of Buenos Aires by the front Vamos Juntos.
He has co-founded and led Officenet (purchased by Staples in 2004), an office supplies retail company. Freire also co-founded Restorando (sold to Tripadvisor), Sirena and Trocafone, all high growth tech companies in Latin America.

Early life 
Freire was raised in the neighborhood of Núñez, in a middle-class family: his father was a doctor and his mother, an English teacher. He attended his secondary school Carlos Pellegrini, where he was a student delegate.

At the age of 18, he created, together with friends, an NGO focused on strengthening leadership and entrepreneurship capacities for young people, Iniciativa Foundation.

Career 
After receiving honors as a Bachelor of Economics from the University of San Andrés, where he co-founded the Student Center, he began his professional career at Procter & Gamble. He quickly turned to the entrepreneurial world: he co-founded Officenet, a company that revolutionized the office material distribution industry in Latin America. He later co-founded Axialent, a consulting firm that helps companies around the world improve their organizational culture: aligning corporate culture and leadership behaviors with long term strategy and company values. He also led other more recent entrepreneurial projects, such as Restorando, Sirena and Trocafone (www.trocafone.com).

He is a leading entrepreneur in the region and he has participated as a guest lecturer and speaker at several universities such as Stanford, Harvard, Notre Dame, Wharton and IE in Spain. He was an ad honorary lecturer at Harvard University and MIT. He is part of the founders' council and was president of Endeavor Argentina, a non-profit organization whose goal is to identify and empower high-impact entrepreneurs.

One of his five books, Pasión por emprender, which was published in Spanish and Portuguese, was best seller in several Latin American countries (including the number one best selling business book in Argentina for five consecutive months since its publication).

He is an OPM (33) from Harvard Business School. A case called "Officenet: how to make entrepreneurship work in Argentina" was written by Harvard Business School and taught at over 25 universities including the universities of Stanford, Chicago, Columbia, Georgetown, IE Business School and Commercial University of Paris.

His awards include "Global Leader for Tomorrow" in 2000 by the World Economic Forum (WEF), "Latin American Entrepreneur of the Year" in 2001 by Endeavor Foundation, and "World Young Business Achiever" in 2002. Freire was also named in 2008 one of the 100 "Young Global Leaders of the World" by the WEF in Davos, Switzerland.

On December 10, 2015, he became Minister of Modernization, Innovation and Technology and President of the Tourism Authority of the City of Buenos Aires in the Government of Horacio Rodríguez Larreta. He was also the main candidate to legislatura of Buenos Aires of the City of Buenos Aires in the mid term election of 2017 when he got a record number of votes (51% vs 16% and 13% for the second and third most voted candidates) in the Frente #VamosJuntos.

Personal life 
He is married to Romina Silvetti with whom he has four children: Tomás, Mateo, Sol and Emilia.

Awards 
 "Global Leader for Tomorrow" in 2000 by the World Economic Forum (WEF).
 "Latin American Entrepreneur of the Year" in 2001 by the Endeavor Foundation.
 "World Young Business Achiever" in 2002.
 He was named one of the 100 "Global Youth Leaders of the World" of the WEF in Davos, Switzerland, in 2008.

Books 
 Pasión por emprender
 50 claves para emprendedores
 El 5% de tu tiempo para cambiar el 100% de la vida de alguien que lo necesita, junto con Julián Weich.
 ¡Libre!, El camino emprendedor como filosofía de vida
 Argentina Emprendedora

References

External links 
 axialent.com
 Andy Freire's Weblog

Living people
1972 births
Harvard Business School alumni
Argentine chief executives